Elevation is the ninth studio album by American R&B singer Tank. It was released on October 25, 2019 by Atlantic Records and his synergetic label R&B Money.

Critical reception

Edward Bowser from Soul in Stereo called Elevation an album "that has definite highlights and is perfect if you’re the type who loves to cherry pick a few tracks to create your own playlist. But if you’re judging this album as a total body of work (which is what we do around here), it lacks the cohesion of Tank’s stronger LPs."

Track listing

Charts

Release history

References

2019 albums
Tank (American singer) albums
Atlantic Records albums